Parramatta railway station is a heritage-listed railway station located on the Main Western line, serving Parramatta in New South Wales, Australia. It is served by Sydney Trains T1 Western Line, T2 Inner West & Leppington and T5 Cumberland Line services and NSW TrainLink Blue Mountains Line, Central West XPT and Outback Xplorer services.

History

Parramatta station is one of Sydney's oldest. Sydney's first line connected Sydney and Parramatta Junction near Granville and opened on 26 September 1855. It was extended to the current Parramatta station on 4 July 1860.

Prior to the Main Western line being quadrupled from Granville to Westmead in 1985, the station consisted of four platforms, platforms 3 and 4 on the main line and 1 and 2 on a loop.

In 1985, the station was refurbished with a new underground subway bus interchange built at the station's north-east side.

In late 2003, work began on a new transport interchange which linked the station to the neighbouring Westfield Parramatta shopping centre. The works included upgrading the station, providing more access to commuters, and constructing a new bus interchange. On 19 February 2006 the interchange was opened.

In October 2016, the Parramatta Turnback Project was completed, adding crossovers to allow trains to terminate on platforms 3–4 in either direction.

The Darcy Street entrance to the station is closed from 1 September 2018 to late 2019 while improvements are made to the station.

Parramatta metro station will be located around a block to the north of the current station and is planned to open in the late 2020s.

Platforms and services

Transport links

Parramatta station has a large bus interchange located on the west side of the station between platform 4 and Westfield Parramatta. It serves a large number of routes operated by Busways, Hillsbus, Transit Systems and Transdev.

Stand A1
Arrivals Only

Stand A2
546: To Epping via Oatlands & North Rocks
549: To Epping via North Rocks
550: To Macquarie Park via Carlingford and Epping
552: To Oatlands
609: To North Parramatta 
625: To Pennant Hills
M92: To Sutherland
NightRide route N60: Fairfield to City Town Hall
NightRide route N70: Penrith to City Town Hall
NightRide route N71: Richmond to City Town Hall
NightRide route N81: To City Town Hall via Sydney Olympic Park

Stand A3
501: To Railway Square via Ryde
521: To Eastwood
523: To West Ryde
524: To Ryde via West Ryde
525: To Strathfield via Sydney Olympic Park
545: To Macquarie Park via Telopea and Eastwood

Stand A4
600: To Hornsby
601: To Rouse Hill Town Centre via Hills Showground
603: To Rouse Hill Town Centre via Glenhaven
604: To Dural via Glenhaven
606: To Winston Hills
706: To Blacktown via Winston Hills

Stand B1
906: To Fairfield
907: To Bankstown via Bass Hill
909: To Bankstown via Auburn & Birrong
M91: To Hurstville via Chester Hill & Padstow

Stand B2
802: To Liverpool via Green Valley
804: To Liverpool via Hinchinbrook
806: To Liverpool via Abbotsbury
810: To Merrylands via Pemulwuy
810X: To Merrylands via Great Western Highway
811: To Pemulwuy via Hilltop Road
811X: To Pemulwuy
NightRide route N60: City Town Hall to Fairfield
NightRide route N70: City Town Hall to Penrith
NightRide route N71: City Town Hall to Richmond
T-Way route T80: To Liverpool via T-way

Stand B3
Arrivals Only

Stand B4
660: To Castlewood
661: To Blacktown station via North West T-Way & Kings Langley
662: To Castle Hill via North West T-Way & Bella Vista
663: To Rouse Hill Station via Kellyville Ridge
664: To Rouse Hill Station via Kellyville
665: To Rouse Hill Station
700: To Blacktown
705: To Blacktown via Seven Hills
708: To Constitution Hill via Pendle Hill
711: To Blacktown via Wentworthville
712: To Westmead Children's Hospital

Route 535 operates from Valentine Avenue as a shuttle service to Carlingford while the Parramatta Light Rail is constructed. This routes stops at all the former stations along the former Carlingford Line except Rosehill Station.

Trackplan
As part of the Parramatta Turnback project, an additional crossover from the Up Main to the Down Main was constructed (not shown) west of the station.

References

External links

Parramatta Station Public Transport Map Transport for NSW
Parramatta station details Transport for New South Wales

Easy Access railway stations in Sydney
Main Western railway line, New South Wales
New South Wales State Heritage Register
Transport infrastructure in Parramatta
Railway stations in Sydney
Railway stations in Australia opened in 1855
Railway stations in Australia opened in 1860